Bordogna Plateau is a high triangular plateau in the south Holland Range of the Shackleton Coast, approximately 45 square miles in extent and varying from 3000 to 4000 meters in elevation. The plateau is bordered by steep cliffs, and by Mount Lloyd on the north and Clarkson Peak and Mount Miller on the south. The abrupt southern cliffs rise 1200 meters above the Bowden Névé. Named by the Advisory Committee on Antarctic Names in 2005 after Joseph Bordogna who served the National Science Foundation as Assistant Director for Engineering (1992–96), Assistant Deputy Director (1996–99), and Deputy Director (1999-2005). Throughout the period he provided key leadership and guidance to the United States Antarctic Program at a number of critical points in its evolution.

References

Shackleton Coast